Volvarina cernita is a species of sea snail, a marine gastropod mollusk in the family Marginellidae, the margin snails.

Description

Distribution

References

Marginellidae
Gastropods described in 1897